The 1987 Spanish motorcycle Grand Prix was the second round of the 1987 Grand Prix motorcycle racing season. It took place on the weekend of 23–26 April 1987 at the Circuito Permanente de Jerez.

Classification

500 cc

References

Spanish motorcycle Grand Prix
Spanish
Motorcycle
Spanish motorcycle Grand Prix